Lat Phrao is one of the 50 districts (khet) of Bangkok, Thailand. The district is bounded by six other districts (from north clockwise): Bang Khen, Bueng Kum, Bang Kapi, Wang Thonglang, and Chatuchak.

History
Formerly, Lat Phrao was a tambon of Bang Kapi district, in what was then Phra Nakhon province, before the unification of Thonburi and Phra Nakhon into the single administrative area of Krung Thep (Bangkok). Later it was a sub-district (tambon) of the Bang Kapi District (amphoe), after naming conventions were changed for administrative districts of Bangkok.

On 4 September 1989, Lat Phrao was split off from Bang Kapi along with Bueng Kum as new districts.

In 1997, the boundaries of Lat Phrao District were modified to balance the size and population of Bangkok's districts. The portion of Chorake Bua sub-district north of Khok Khram and Ta Reng canals was reassigned to Bang Khen district, and portions of the Lat Phrao sub-district were added to Wang Thonglang district.

On 24 January 2002, portions of Wang Thonglang District were reassigned to Lat Phrao Sub-district.

The word Lat Phrao can mean 'slope of coconut'. The district seal features a coconut putting forth two fresh leaves.

Administration
The district is divided into two sub-districts (khwaeng).

District council
The district council for Lat Phrao has seven members, who each serve four-year terms. Elections were last held on 30 April 2006. The results were seven seats for the Thai Rak Thai Party.

References

 
Districts of Bangkok